Cytochrome P450 family 109 subfamily E member 1 (abbreviated CYP109E1) is a prokaryote monooxygenase originally from Bacillus megaterium, could atc as a 24- and 25-Hydroxylase for Cholesterol.

References 

Cytochrome P450
Prokaryote genes